Gaelic Sports Club Luxembourg is a GAA club in Luxembourg. The club caters for Gaelic football, hurling and camogie.

History
Hurling, football and camogie have been played by the Irish community in Luxembourg since the accession of Ireland to the European Economic Community in the early 1970s. The club was formally established in 1978. It is registered as an Association sans but lucratif with the Luxembourbourgish authorities.

The club became a founding member of the European County Board of the GAA in 1999 and has participated in European competitions ever since.

The club has won four Women's football Championships, two Camogie Championships, one Gaelic Football Championship and one Hurling Championship.

Honours
 4 European Ladies Football Championships (2002, 2003, 2004, 2006)
 2 European Football Championship (2007, 2016)
 2 European Camogie Championships (2008, 2009)
 2 European Hurling Championship (2008, 2017)

See also
 List of footballers (Gaelic football)
 Ladies' Gaelic football
 List of Gaelic football clubs
 Sport in Ireland
 Sport in Luxembourg

References

External links
 Club website
 European Board website

Gaelic football clubs in Europe
Hurling clubs in Europe
Sports teams in Luxembourg
Gaelic Athletic Association clubs established in 1978
1978 establishments in Luxembourg